The 1990 Cheltenham Council election took place on 3 May 1990 to elect members of Cheltenham Borough Council in Gloucestershire, England. One third of the council was up for election. The Social and Liberal Democrats became the biggest party, but fell one seat short of a majority, meaning the council stayed in no overall control.

After the election, the composition of the council was
Social and Liberal Democrats 16
Conservative 15
Labour 2

Election result

Ward results

References

Cheltenham
Cheltenham Borough Council elections
1990s in Gloucestershire